The Dean-Hartshorn House is a historic house located at 68 Dean Street in Taunton, Massachusetts.

Description and history 
It was built in about 1798 for Abiezar Dean. The -story structure features brick ends, four symmetrically placed chimneys, and a classically detailed front entrance.

In 1905, the house was purchased by George Hartshorn, who added the east and west wings and dormers. In 1915 the east wing was removed and relocated to nearby Longmeadow Road and converted into a residence.

It was added to the National Register of Historic Places on July 5, 1984. It currently functions as a nursing home.

See also
National Register of Historic Places listings in Taunton, Massachusetts

References

National Register of Historic Places in Taunton, Massachusetts
Houses in Taunton, Massachusetts
Houses on the National Register of Historic Places in Bristol County, Massachusetts
Houses completed in 1798
Georgian architecture in Massachusetts